Stephen Philip Cummings (born 19 March 1981) is an English former racing cyclist, who rode professionally between 2005 and 2019 for the , , , ,  and  squads.

Biography
Cummings won the team pursuit at the 2005 UCI Track Cycling World Championships in Los Angeles and at the 2006 Commonwealth Games in Melbourne. He also took bronze in the individual pursuit at the 2006 Commonwealth Games. At the 2004 Olympics in Athens Cummings and the Great Britain team won the silver medal in the team pursuit and achieved a time of 3:59.866 in the heats.

In 1999, riding for Birkenhead North End CC as a junior, aged 17, Cummings won the Eddie Soens Memorial Road Race, a handicap race open to all categories. It remains the only time in 46 years that a junior has won. He went on to take the junior British National Road Race Championships that year.

His first professional win was in 2008, stage 2 of the Giro della Provincia di Reggio Calabria.

Team Sky (2010–11)

Cummings joined new British-based  for the 2010 season.

In 2011, racing with Sky, he had arguably his most successful professional race to date at the Volta ao Algarve. He won stage three in a mountain-top finish ahead of Alberto Contador, taking the overall lead of the race which he held until the final time-trial; he finished the tour in seventh place.

In September, Cummings finished second overall in the Tour of Britain. Later that month he announced he would join  for the 2012 season.

Cummings was part of the Great Britain team that helped Mark Cavendish win the men's road race at the 2011 UCI Road World Championships. He then finished 4th overall in the first Tour of Beijing.

BMC Racing Team (2012–15)
In February 2012, Cummings broke his pelvis in an accident while competing in the Volta ao Algarve. In April, bad luck struck again when he fractured his left wrist in the Tour of the Basque Country. He recuperated from those injuries and competed in the Tour de France, where he was a domestique to his leader Cadel Evans and finished 95th overall. In the 2012 Vuelta a España, he gained his first Grand Tour victory. On Stage 13, he broke away with six other riders after the first hour of racing.

MTN–Qhubeka/Dimension Data (2015–19)
In October 2014, Cummings announced that he would be joining  for the 2015 season.

On 18 July 2015, Cummings won stage 14 of the Tour de France, beating French riders Thibaut Pinot and Romain Bardet in Mende,  after the Côte de la Croix Neuve category 2 climb. It was the first Tour de France stage win for both Cummings and his African team , fittingly coming on Mandela Day. On 8 July 2016, Cummings took another breakaway win in the Tour de France, this time on Stage 7, with a winning margin of 65 seconds over Daryl Impey and Daniel Navarro.

In July 2016 he was added to Great Britain's Olympic cycling team for the Summer Olympics, replacing Peter Kennaugh. Cummings took what British journalist William Fotheringham considered to be the most important stage race victory of his career up to that date at the Tour of Britain in September 2016. He finished 2nd on stage 2 in Kendal, Cumbria, gaining a minute over most of his rivals. He subsequently moved into the lead on stage 6 and held this position for the remaining two days.

During the 2017 Tour of the Basque Country Cummings crashed heavily and required surgery. After a long period of recovery he won both the British National Time Trial Championships and the British National Road Race Championships on the Isle of Man, becoming only the second rider to win both titles in the same year after David Millar achieved the same feat in 2007.

In November 2019, Cummings announced his retirement from professional cycling.

Major results

1999
 1st  Road race, National Junior Road Championships
 1st Eddie Soens Memorial Race
2001
 1st  Team pursuit, National Track Championships
2004
 2nd  Team pursuit, Olympic Games
2005
 1st  Team pursuit, UCI Track World Championships
 1st  Team pursuit, National Track Championships
 2nd Road race, National Road Championships
 6th Grand Prix de Villers-Cotterêts
2006
 Commonwealth Games
1st  Team pursuit
3rd  Individual pursuit
4th Road race
 1st  Team pursuit, National Track Championships
 2nd  Team pursuit, UCI Track World Championships
 2nd Trofeo Laigueglia
2007
 1st  Team pursuit, UCI Track World Cup Classics, Sydney
2008
 1st Coppa Bernocchi
 2nd Overall Giro della Provincia di Reggio Calabria
1st Stage 2
 2nd Overall Danmark Rundt
 2nd Overall Tour of Britain
2009
 1st Stage 3 Giro del Capo
 4th Coppa Bernocchi
 5th Giro della Provincia di Reggio Calabria
 7th Trofeo Laigueglia
2010
 4th Grand Prix d'Ouverture La Marseillaise
2011
 2nd Time trial, National Road Championships
 2nd Overall Tour of Britain
 4th Overall Tour of Beijing
 7th Overall Volta ao Algarve
1st Stage 3
 9th Overall Tour de Pologne
 9th Overall Tour Méditerranéen
2012
 1st Stage 13 Vuelta a España
 1st Stage 5 Tour of Beijing
2013
 1st Stage 2 (TTT) Tour of Qatar
2014
 1st  Overall Tour Méditerranéen
1st Stage 4 (ITT)
 2nd Overall Dubai Tour
 4th Overall Tour du Poitou-Charentes
 7th Time trial, Commonwealth Games
 8th Overall Circuit de la Sarthe
2015
 1st Trofeo Andratx-Mirador d'Es Colomer
 1st Stage 14 Tour de France
 6th Overall Tirreno–Adriatico
 6th Overall Circuit de la Sarthe
2016
 1st  Overall Tour of Britain
 1st Stage 7 Tour de France
 1st Stage 4 Tirreno–Adriatico
 1st Stage 3 Tour of the Basque Country
 1st Stage 7 Criterium du Dauphiné
2017
 National Road Championships
1st  Road race
1st  Time trial
 1st Stage 1 Giro della Toscana
  Combativity award Stage 12 Tour de France
2019
 3rd Time trial, National Road Championships
 10th Overall Arctic Race of Norway

Grand Tour general classification results timeline

References

External links

 

1981 births
Living people
British male cyclists
English male cyclists
Cyclists at the 2006 Commonwealth Games
Commonwealth Games bronze medallists for England
Commonwealth Games gold medallists for England
Cyclists at the 2004 Summer Olympics
Cyclists at the 2008 Summer Olympics
Cyclists at the 2016 Summer Olympics
Olympic silver medallists for Great Britain
Olympic cyclists of Great Britain
Olympic medalists in cycling
British Tour de France stage winners
British Vuelta a España stage winners
Medalists at the 2004 Summer Olympics
People from Bebington
Cyclists at the 2014 Commonwealth Games
UCI Track Cycling World Champions (men)
Commonwealth Games medallists in cycling
British cycling road race champions
English track cyclists
Directeur sportifs
Sportspeople from Wirral
Medallists at the 2006 Commonwealth Games